New Zealand - Turkey relations are the bilateral relationship between New Zealand and the Republic of Turkey. New Zealand and Turkey formalised diplomatic relations between both countries in 1979 but had unofficial forms of contact with each other prior to 1979. Both New Zealand and Turkey are members of numerous organisations such as the OECD, World Trade Organization, United Nations and World Health Organization. New Zealand has an embassy in Ankara and Turkey has an embassy in Wellington.

Country Comparison 
The Republic of Turkey is the official name of Turkey. The state also encompasses a total land area of 769,630 square km. Turkey has a population of 84,339,067 and has a population density of 110 square km. The capital of Turkey is Ankara and the largest city within Turkey is Istanbul. Istanbul has a population of 15,415,000. The first head of state was Mustafa Kemal Atatürk, and the current leader is Recep Tayyip Erdoğan. The Republic of Turkey was established October 1923. The Republic of Turkey overthrew the previous Ottoman government through the Turkish National Movement. The official language of Turkey is Turkish language, and the currency is the Lira. The GDP (nominal) of Turkey is 719,954,821.68 and its GDP per capita is 8,536.40.

New Zealand also called Aotearoa is an island nation in the southwest Pacific Ocean. The country encompasses a land area of 263,310 square km. The population of New Zealand is 5,084,300. The population density is 19 square km. The capital city of New Zealand is Wellington and the largest city in New Zealand is Auckland. The current leader of New Zealand is Chris Hipkins. The official language of New Zealand is English, New Zealand Sign Language and Māori language. The official currency name is the New Zealand Dollar. The GDP (nominal) of New Zealand is 210,700,848.97 and its GDP per capita is 41,441.5.

Background 
New Zealand's historical relationship with Turkey is highly connected to the British relationship with Turkey and the Ottoman Empire. New Zealand first relationship with Turkey is centred around World War I and the Gallipoli campaign.

In WW1 the Ottoman Empire who is the predecessor state to the modern state of Turkey and the British Empire were on opposing sides. The British was on the side of the Allies of World War I and the Ottoman Empire was on the side of the Central Powers. New Zealand being a part of the British Empire was on the side of the Allied Powers.

In WW1 the allied powers opened an offensive front in Gallipoli in 1915. The main combatants on the side of the allies were the British, French, and Australian and New Zealand Army Corps (ANZACs). On the side of the Central Powers were the Ottoman Empire supported by the German Empire and Austria-Hungary. In the Gallipoli campaign the number of casualties and losses for the allies totalled 141,547 where 2,779 New Zealanders were killed and 5,212 were wounded and on the Ottoman side there 251,309 casualties and losses where 86,692 were killed.

In World War II Turkey was a neutral power until the later stages of the war where Turkey declared war against Nazi Germany and Empire of Japan in 1945.

New Zealand declared war against Germany in 1939 and Japan in 1941. In WW2 both Turkey and New Zealand were on the same side. Post WW2 the United Nations was founded and both Turkey and New Zealand were both founding members of the UN.

History
In January 1992 Turkey opened an embassy in Wellington, with New Zealand opening an embassy in Ankara in 1993.

A memorial to Mustafa Kemal Atatürk, the commander of the Turkish forces at Gallipoli who went on to become the founder of modern Turkey, is sited at Tarakina Bay overlooking the entrance to Wellington harbour.

On 23 October 2021, Turkish President Recep Tayyip Erdoğan declared the New Zealand Ambassador Wendy Hinton "persona non grata" after she joined the ambassadors of nine other Western countries including the United States, Germany, Canada, Denmark, Finland, France, the Netherlands, Norway and Sweden in calling for the release of the imprisoned businessman and philanthropist Osman Kavala. On 25 October, Erdogan backtracked on his initial threats to expel the ten ambassadors following criticism from opposition parties, stating that the diplomats had fulfilled their commitment to Article 41 of the Vienna Convention on Diplomatic Relations and that they would be more careful in their future statements.

In 2023, Following the 2023 Turkey-Syria earthquakes in which a 7.8 magnitude earthquake struck Turkey and Syria, resulting in thousands of casualties and widespread damage, the New Zealand government responded by committing $1.5 million in humanitarian support to assist in the relief efforts. The financial assistance was given to the International Federation of Red Cross and Red Crescent Societies, would support the delivery of essential relief items such as food, medical aid, and psychological support to affected individuals in both countries. The government indicated that further support may be provided as needed. The earthquake prompted the Ministry of Foreign Affairs to advise all New Zealanders in Turkey to follow the advice of local authorities and register their details on the SafeTravel website. Prime Minister Chris Hipkins also expressed condolences to those affected by the disaster and noted that New Zealand, having experienced earthquakes before, had a special connection with those affected.

Diplomatic Relationship 
New Zealand and Turkey has had a range of diplomatic relations since the start of official diplomatic relations in 1979. New Zealand and Turkey have a range of diplomatic relations including foreign policy, military relations, and economic relations.

New Zealand is a part of numerous international organisations such as the United Nations (UN), The World Trade Organisation (WTO), World Bank, International Monetary Fund (IMF), OECD, Asian Development Bank, and Asia-Pacific Economic Cooperation (APEC). The organisations that New Zealand is part of tend to be regionally in Asia or the Pacific Islands or large international organisations such as the IMF, UN, and the World Bank.

Turkey is also part of numerous international organisations such as the United Nations (UN), The World trade organisation (WTO), the World Health Organisation (WHO), The International Monetary Fund (IMF), the World bank, Organisation of Islamic Cooperation, The Organisation for Economic Cooperation and Development (OECD) and Organization for Security and Co-operation in Europe. The organisations that Turkey tend of be part of is either cultural organisations, regional organisations, or large international organisations such as the World Bank.

Turkey and New Zealand also has a significant trade and economic relationship. The trade relationship is currently worth around 255 million (NZD). The trade volume has reduced since its height in 2019. In 2019 the trade relationship was worth around 367 million (NZD). Globally the COVID-19 pandemic has impacted the trading relationship globally including the trade relationship between New Zealand and Turkey.

Despite Turkey and the West being allies due to NATO there has been tension in the relationship. New Zealand being close partners with NATO countries is align in this foreign policy outlook. New Zealand has also mentioned issues with Turkey's rule of law, and it return Turkey has stated that their judiciary system is independent.

Contemporary Relationship 
New Zealand and Turkey relations encompass a range of different sectors from economic, military, foreign relations and academic. New Zealand and Turkey are both countries which take part in a range of different international organisations such as the WTO, WHO and UN.

Educational 
There is a strong ongoing relationship between New Zealand and Turkey in the realm of educational and academic exchange. There is ongoing exchange programs between New Zealand and Turkey such as the University of Otago exchange program with the Middle East Technical University.

War on Terror 
In the September 11 attacks and the global war on terror. Both New Zealand and Turkey have been active participants in the global war on terror. New Zealand and Turkey both participated in the International Security Assistance Force. The International Security Assistance Force (ISAF) was a multinational military mission in Afghanistan from 2001 to 2014. It was established by United Nations Security Council Resolution 1386 which authorised the establishment of the International Security Assistance Force (ISAF) to assist the Afghan Interim Administration. ISAF's primary goal was to train the Afghan National Security Forces (ANSF) and assist Afghanistan in rebuilding key government institutions. It later took part in the war in Afghanistan against the Taliban insurgency.

Iraq War 
On 1 March 2003, The Turkish parliament rejected being an active member of the US-led coalition forces in Iraq. This decision from the Grand National Assembly of Turkey was seen as a reaction against the unilateral action of United States and a desire to keep Turkey away from the Iraq war. Turkey not being an active participant in the Iraq War came at a cost of Kurdish leaders of Iraq gaining more power due to allying with the US during the war.

New Zealand contributed a small engineering and support force to assist in post-war reconstruction and provision of humanitarian aid. New Zealand staff officers are still working with coalition forces to this day. New Zealand and some long-standing US allies which include France and Germany opposed the Invasion of Iraq. These leaders argued that there was no evidence of weapons of mass destruction in Iraq and that invading the country was not justified. Chemical Warheads, shells and aviation bombs were discovered during the Iraq War but these were built earlier in Saddam rule prior to the 1991 Gulf War.

Covid-19 
Coronavirus disease 2019 (COVID-19) is a contagious disease caused by the severe acute respiratory syndrome coronavirus 2 (SARS-CoV-2). The disease has spread worldwide leading to an ongoing global pandemic.

Countries have taken stances to minimise the impact of COVID-19 on their countries. In the Covid-19 pandemic both Turkey and New Zealand took similar responses. New Zealand and Turkey initiated and restricted international travel initially just from China where it was first identified but then gradually expanded to numerous countries such as Italy and America. New Zealand and Turkey also conducted lockdowns and restrictions to reduce community spread. In this pandemic both countries also underwent struggles such as shortages of toilet paper and masks.

The introduction of new Covid-19 variants such as SARS-CoV-2 Delta variant and SARS-CoV-2 Omicron variant has introduced new restrictions in both New Zealand and Turkey despite this however Covid-19 cases are increasing in both countries due to the omicron variant.

Turkey and New Zealand both have a high vaccination rates with both Turkey and New Zealand having more than half their population being fully vaccination from Covid-19.

Visits

Head of State

Prime Minister

Minister of foreign Affairs

See also 
 Foreign relations of Turkey
 Foreign relations of New Zealand
 Turks in New Zealand

References

External links
 New Zealand embassy in Ankara (also covers Jordan and Israel Embassy)
 Turkish embassy in Wellington
 New Zealand Ministry of Foreign Affairs and Trade about relations with Turkey
   Turkish Ministry of Foreign Affaires about relations with New Zealand

 
Turkey
Bilateral relations of Turkey